Nolan McGuire is a guitarist and tour manager from Chicago.

Career

The Parker Brothers 
Nolan's earliest work was with The Parker Brothers. He also performed on a tour with Digger.

The Honor System 
McGuire played on The Honor System's debut album Single File and subsequent EP 100% Synthetic. Whereas vocalist Dan Hanaway tended to play lower and more rhythmic parts, McGuire typically contributed higher-register arpeggios and leads, frequently featuring bending, sliding and double-stops. However, neither guitarist was limited to lead or rhythm; trading and interweaving of guitar parts played a large part in the band's sound. Nolan left the band some time before their second album, The Rise And Run, and was replaced by Tyler Wiseman, whose arrival heralded a shift of the band's sound in a heavier direction, although the interlinked guitar parts remained a key feature.

Alkaline Trio 
McGuire was the tour manager for Alkaline Trio and played second guitar for them live. These parts are usually written and played on record by the band's guitarist Matt Skiba; however, McGuire received writing/recording credits for lead guitar on the song "Sadie" on the One Man Army split and, later, Crimson.

References

American punk rock guitarists
Year of birth missing (living people)
Living people
Guitarists from Chicago
The Honor System (band) members